A tapeworm is a member of a class of parasitic worms. 

Tapeworm may also refer to:

 Tapeworm infection, caused by the above worms
 Computer worms, originally called tapeworms
 Tapeworm (band), an American band, a defunct Nine Inch Nails side project
 Tapeworm (film), a 2019 Canadian feature film, directed by Milos Mitrovic and Fabian Velasco
 Tapeworm (game), a 2021 tabletop card game, designed by Edmund McMillen